George Millican may refer to:

George Millican, namesake of Millican, Oregon
George Millican, character in Humans (TV series)